This article lists the official squads for the 2002 Women's Rugby World Cup in Barcelona, Spain.

Pool A

New Zealand
Coach: Darryl Suasua

Australia
Coach: Stephen Swan

Wales
Coach: Richard James Talmage Hodges

Germany
Coach: Jens Michau

Pool B

France
Coach: Wanda Noury

United States
Head Coach: Martin Gallagher
Forwards Coach: Tim Breckenridge
Backs Coach: George Metuarau

Kazakhstan
Coach: Alexander Stalmakhovich

Netherlands
Coach: Nel Roeleveld

Pool C

England
Coach: Heather Stirrup

Spain

Italy
Coach: Roberto Esposito

Japan
Head Coach: Noriko Kishida

Pool D

Canada
Coach: Roxanne Butler

Ireland
Coach: Grainne O'Connell

Samoa
Coach: Feturi Elisaia

Scotland
Coach: Ruth Cranston

Notes and references

 

Squads
2002